The Malone Central School District is a school district in Malone, New York, United States. The district operates five schools: Franklin Academy, Malone Middle School, Davis Elementary, Flanders Elementary and St. Josephs Elementary.

External links 
  Malone Central Schools

School districts in New York (state)
Education in Franklin County, New York